= Ingeborg Hanreich Verlag =

Austrian book publisher

- Founded: 1994; 31 years ago
- Founder: Ingeborg Hanreich
- Country of origin: Austria
- Distribution: Worldwide
- Publication types: Books
- Nonfiction topics: nutrition, art and music, children's fiction
- No. of employees: 5,712 (as of December 31, 2012)
- Official website: www.hanreich-verlag.at

Ingeborg Hanreich Verlag is an Austrian publisher located in Vienna. It was established in 1994, originally publishing books on infant nutrition. Beginning in 2009, the company began publishing books on art and music, and in 2012 began publishing children's fiction.

== Awards ==
The children's book Frau Bertas ganz persönlicher Frühling won an ACUTE award for excellent fairy tale.
